The 1960 Saint Louis Billikens men's soccer team represented Saint Louis University during the 1960 NCAA Division I men's soccer season. The Billikens won their second NCAA title this season. It was the third-ever season the Billikens fielded a men's varsity soccer team.

Schedule 

|-
!colspan=6 style=""| Regular season
|-

|-

|-

|-

|-

|-

|-

|-

|-

|-

|-

|-

|-
!colspan=6 style=""| NCAA Tournament
|-

|-

|-

|-

References

External links 

 Results

Saint Louis Billikens men's soccer seasons
1960 NCAA soccer independents season
Saint Louis
NCAA Division I Men's Soccer Tournament-winning seasons
NCAA Division I Men's Soccer Tournament College Cup seasons
American men's college soccer teams 1960 season